Houghton is a surname. Notable people with the surname include:

 Adam Houghton (1310–1389), English or Welsh, Bishop of St. David's, Lord Chancellor of England
 Alice Houghton (1849-1920), Canadian-born American broker
 Amo Houghton (1926–2020), American politician
 Amory Houghton (1899–1981), American diplomat and scouting notable
 Arthur Boyd Houghton (1836–1875), British painter and illustrator
 Bob Houghton (born 1947), English football manager
 Buck Houghton (1915–1999), American television producer
 Chantelle Houghton (born 1983), British model and participant in Celebrity Big Brother
 Charles Frederick Houghton (1839–1898), Canadian politician
 Claude Houghton (1886–1961), British novelist
 Daniel Houghton (1740–1791), Irish explorer of Africa
 Don Houghton (1930–1991), British television screenwriter
 Dorothy D. Houghton (1890–1972), American politician and clubwoman
 Douglass Houghton (1809–1845), American geologist
 Eric Houghton (1910–1996), English football player and manager
 Ernest Houghton (1893–1941), American basketball player
 Evangeline Florence Houghton (1867–1928), American-born soprano
 Evelyn Houghton (1908–1983), British artist
 Fred Houghton (died 1918), English semi-professional footballer
 Harold Houghton (1906–1986), English footballer
 Harry Houghton (1906–?), British naval officer who spied for the Polish and Soviet secret services
 Helen Houghton, New Zealand politician 
 Henry Oscar Houghton (1823–1895), American publisher
 Israel Houghton (born 1971), American Christian music singer
 Jim Houghton (born 1948), American actor and writer
 James R. Houghton, American businessman 
 John Houghton (martyr) (died 1535), English Catholic priest and martyr
 John T. Houghton (1931–2020), British scientist
 John Houghton (Manx politician), Isle of Man politician 
 John Houghton (footballer), New Zealand international football (soccer) player
 Katharine Houghton (born 1945), American actress 
 Kenneth J. Houghton (1920–2006), American Marine general, Navy Cross recipient
 Kris Houghton, known as Kris Kardashian or Kris Jenner, reality TV star
 Laura Mersini-Houghton (born 1969), Albanian theoretical physicist-cosmologist
 Nick Houghton (born 1954), British Army officer
 Peter Houghton (1938–2007), British artificial heart transplant patient
 Peter Houghton (footballer) (born 1954), English footballer
 Ray Houghton (born 1962), Scottish-born Irish footballer
 Sherman Otis Houghton (1828–1914), American politician
 Stanley Houghton (1881–1913), English playwright
 Steph Houghton (born 1988), English footballer
 Thomas Houghton (priest) (1859–1951), Irish-born Anglican clergyman
 Thomas Houghton (rugby league), English rugby league player
 Thomas Houghton (architect) (1840–1903), American architect
 Vasey Houghton (1921–2001), Australian politician

See also
 Richard Monckton Milnes, 1st Baron Houghton (1809–1885), English poet and politician
 Douglas Houghton, Baron Houghton of Sowerby (1898–1996), British Labour politician
 Horton (surname)
 Hawton
 Hoghton (disambiguation)

English-language surnames